Panera Bread is an American chain store of bakery-café fast casual restaurants with over 2,000 locations, all of which are in the United States and Canada. Its headquarters are in Sunset Hills, Missouri.

The company operates as Saint Louis Bread Company in the Greater St. Louis area, where it has over 100 locations. Offerings include bakery items, pasta, salads, sandwiches, soups, and specialty drinks.  As of 2020, the menu also includes flatbread pizzas.

The company, which until 2021 also owned Au Bon Pain, is owned by JAB Holding Company, which is, in turn, owned by the Reimann family of Germany.

Panera offers a wide array of pastries and baked goods, such as bagels, brownies, cookies, croissants, muffins, and scones. These, along with Panera's artisan breads, are typically baked before dawn by an on-staff baker. Aside from the bakery section, Panera has a regular menu for dine-in or takeout including flatbreads, pizzas, warm grain bowls, panini, pasta, salads, sandwiches, side choices, and soups, as well as coffee, espresso drinks, frozen drinks, fruit smoothies, hot chocolate, iced drinks, lattes, lemonade, and tea.

Panera was once the largest provider of free Wi-Fi hotspots in the United States.

History

Ken and Linda Rosenthal founded the St. Louis Bread Company in 1987 with the first location in Kirkwood, Missouri. The Rosenthals invested $150,000 and received a $150,000 Small Business Administration loan.

Au Bon Pain Co., a public company, purchased the St. Louis Bread Company in 1993 for $23 million.

In 1997, Au Bon Pain changed the company name to Panera, from a word that has roots in the Latin word for "breadbasket" and is identical to the word for "breadbasket" in Spanish and Catalan. It kept its original name for locations in Missouri. At the same time, the St. Louis Bread Company renovated its 20 bakery-cafés in the St. Louis area.

In May 1999, Au Bon Pain Co. sold Au Bon Pain to the firm Bruckmann, Rosser, Sherrill & Co. for $78 million, in order to focus on the Panera Bread chain.

In 2000, Panera Bread moved its headquarters to Richmond Heights, Missouri.

In 2007, Panera Bread purchased a 51% stake in Paradise Bakery & Café, a Phoenix metropolitan area-based concept with over 70 locations in 10 states, predominantly in the west and southwest, for $21.1 million. The company purchased the balance of Paradise in June 2009.

A class action lawsuit was filed against the company in February 2008, alleging it failed to disclose material adverse facts about the company's financial well-being, business relationships, and prospects. In February 2011, Panera agreed to pay $5.75 million to shareholders while admitting no wrongdoing, settling the lawsuit.

In November 2010, Panera Bread relocated its headquarters to Sunset Hills while vacating its Richmond Heights headquarters and Brentwood, Missouri offices. The company leased additional space for its headquarters in 2013.

Expansion into Canada

In October 2008, Panera Bread expanded into Canada, opening locations in Richmond Hill, Thornhill, Oakville, and Mississauga in the Greater Toronto Area.

Ordering

In May 2014, Panera unveiled "Panera 2.0", a series of integrated technologies including new capabilities for digital ordering, payment, operations, and ultimately, consumption. It includes tablet kiosks with iPads, which the company calls Fast Lane, where customers may place an order and pay without approaching the counter. Customers can also place orders and pay via an app on their smartphone or tablet. In 2017, digital orders accounted for over $1 billion in orders or 26% of sales.

Rebranding, acquisitions, and use of technology

Paradise Bakery & Café locations were rebranded in September 2015 as Panera Bread.

In the fourth quarter of 2015, Panera acquired a majority stake in Tatte Bakery & Cafe, a bakery-cafe concept chain with locations in the Boston area, later opening in metro Washington D.C.

On March 23, 2016, Panera opened its 2,000th location, a cafe in Elyria, Ohio.

In January 2017, Panera announced its food menu was free of artificial colors, flavors, sweeteners, and preservatives.

JAB Holding Company acquired the company on July 11, 2017, for $7.5 billion.

Panera announced on November 8, 2017, that founder Ron Shaich was stepping down as CEO, and company president Blaine Hurst would take over. Shaich remained chairman. The company also announced the acquisition of Au Bon Pain.

Panera divested Tatte Bakery & Café to Act III Holdings, LLC, owned by Shaich in January 2018.

In January 2018, the company formed a consulting business to help restaurants remove artificial ingredients from their menus.

On April 2, 2018, Brian Krebs reported that the Panera Bread website had leaked between 7 million and 37 million customer records — including names, email and physical addresses, customer loyalty account numbers, birthdays, and the last four digits of the customers' credit card numbers — for at least eight months before the site was taken offline. Panera was notified privately about the vulnerability in August 2017 but failed to fix it until after it was disclosed publicly eight months later. Panera said the leak affected fewer than 10,000 customers and had been fixed.

In August 2022, the company announced that it was testing the use of artificial intelligence in its drive-thru lanes via two locations in upstate New York. It used OpenCity’s voice ordering technology, Tori. At the time of the announcement, roughly 45% of the chain's locations have drive-thru lanes. In making this move, the firm was joining other firms in the restaurant industry, like McDonald's, Burger King, and Taco Bell, and it came on top of other uses of artificial intelligence at the chain.

Delivery services

The company introduced delivery services in May 2018, servicing 897 cities in 43 states, employing its own drivers. According to the company, this created 13,000 jobs.

On October 28, 2020, Panera announced they would add pizza to their menu to increase dinner options for customers.

Panera announced on August 25, 2021, that it had merged with Caribou Coffee and Einstein Bros. Bagels to form Panera Brands.

Social responsibility

Panera Cares: non-profit restaurants 
In 2010, the company's nonprofit foundation created Panera Cares, a "Pay what you can" restaurant in its home market of St. Louis. CEO Ron Shaich based the idea on an NBC profile of the SAME Cafe in Denver, Colorado. It later expanded the concept to Dearborn, Michigan; Portland, Oregon; Chicago; and Boston. Several of their sites served 3,500 customers weekly. The Panera Cares in Chicago shut down at the end of January 2015. The Panera Cares in Portland, Oregon shut down at the end of June 2016. The original location near St. Louis closed in January 2018. The last location in Boston closed on February 15, 2019.

Caged and cage-free eggs 
On November 5, 2015, Panera pledged that it would use only cage-free eggs in all of its stores by 2020. Panera also announced the addition of more plant-based proteins, such as edamame and organic quinoa, to its menu. At the time of the announcement, the company said it was 21% cage-free in the roughly 70 million eggs it used in 2015. In December 2016, it published its third animal welfare progress report, announcing new efforts to improve broiler chicken welfare. In 2021, Panera announced that it had transitioned to cage-free eggs for 65% of its egg supply but not yet the remaining 35%.

Community giving
The Day-End Dough-Nation program provides unsold bread and baked goods to local area hunger relief agencies and charities. Panera Bread bakery-cafes donate $100 million worth of unsold bread and baked goods annually to local organizations in need. Panera also supports events held by nonprofit organizations serving those in need by donating a certificate or fresh bakery products.

Lawsuits

Violation of California Labor Code
In 2009 and 2011, class action lawsuits were filed by former workers alleging that the company violated the California Labor Code, failed to pay overtime, failed to provide meal and rest periods, failed to pay employees upon termination, and violated California's Unfair Competition Law. Panera paid $5 million to settle all claims and denied any wrongdoing.

Racial discrimination allegation (2011)
In 2011, a former employee filed a racial discrimination lawsuit alleging that he was fired after repeatedly having a Black man work the cash register instead of putting him in a less visible location, and assigning "pretty young girls" as the cashiers, as requested by supervisors. The plaintiff also said he was fired after requesting another month off after returning from three months of sick leave. Panera said that it "does not discriminate based on national origin, race or sex" and that the plaintiff "was terminated because he had used all of his medical leave and was unable to return to work". The plaintiff worked in a store owned by franchisee Sam Covelli, who also owns the stores that were involved in the 2003 racial discrimination lawsuit. Covelli Enterprises is the single largest franchisee of Panera Bread with nearly 300 stores in Ohio, Pennsylvania, West Virginia, and Florida. The lawsuit was settled in June 2012.

Peanut butter allergy 
In 2016, a lawsuit was filed after an employee at a Natick, Massachusetts store put peanut butter on a sandwich, despite being informed that the person receiving the sandwich had a peanut allergy. The plaintiffs charged the company and those employees involved with intentional infliction of emotional distress and negligent infliction of emotional distress as well as assault and battery. The recipient of the sandwich was hospitalized briefly.

Class action for failure to pay overtime wages (2017)
In December 2017, former employees filed a class action lawsuit against the company, claiming they were not paid overtime wages.

Tabler v. Panera LLC et al 
In March 2019, a class action lawsuit was filed by Plaintiff Brianna Tabler in California, accusing Panera of false advertising and fraud. While Panera's former CEO Ron Schaich claimed that Panera's menus continue to be completely void of artificial flavors, sweeteners, and ingredients, Tabler argues against the company's intentional redaction of the fact that their products contain traces of the synthetic biocide glyphosate. In October 2019, Judge Lucy Koh granted a motion to dismiss the lawsuit. Tabler filed an amended complaint in November 2019, to which Panera filed in January 2020 another motion to dismiss. Tabler filed a motion to voluntarily dismiss the complaint on July 30, 2020, closing the case.

Awards and recognition

In 2005, Panera ranked 37th on Bloomberg BusinessWeek'''s list of "Hot Growth Companies", earning $38.6 million with a 42.9 percent increase in profits.

In a 2008 Health'' magazine study, Panera Bread was judged North America's healthiest fast casual restaurant.

In 2009 and 2012, Zagat named Panera one of the most popular restaurants for eating on the go.

Panera was also rated No. 1 for Best Healthy Option, Best Salad, and Best Facilities, among restaurants with fewer than 5,000 locations in 2009.

See also
 List of bakeries
 List of fast food restaurant chains
 List of restaurant chains in the United States

References

External links

 

1987 establishments in Missouri
2017 mergers and acquisitions
Restaurants established in 1987
American companies established in 1987
American subsidiaries of foreign companies
Bakeries of the United States
Bakery cafés
Companies based in St. Louis County, Missouri
Companies formerly listed on the Nasdaq
Culture of St. Louis
Fast-food chains of the United States
Fast-food franchises
Fast casual restaurants
Restaurant chains in the United States
Restaurant franchises